Ronald Liepert  (born October 8, 1949) is a Canadian politician from Alberta who serves as the Member of Parliament for Calgary Signal Hill in the House of Commons of Canada. He previously served in the Cabinet of Alberta as Minister of Finance, Energy, Health and Wellness and Education under premiers Ed Stelmach and Alison Redford. From 2004 to 2012, he was a Member of the Legislative Assembly of Alberta, representing the constituency of Calgary-West, as a Progressive Conservative legislator. On April 12, 2014, Liepert won the federal Conservative nomination in Calgary Signal Hill, defeating incumbent Rob Anders, and was elected to parliament in 2015. He was re-elected in 2019 and 2021.

Early life
Liepert was born in Saltcoats, Saskatchewan in 1949. He grew up on his family's farm and attended a small rural school. He left high school in the middle of grade 11 at the age of 17. He moved to Alberta, where he took a job in Calgary with Rosco Steel. For three years Liepert returned to the family farm to help with the crop, but he became disillusioned with farming and he moved to Calgary permanently. He was working at Burns Foods in 1971 when he decided to enroll in the Columbia School of Broadcasting. In 1972, Liepert, married and with an infant daughter, joined CHAB (AM) in Moose Jaw, Saskatchewan. In the mid-1970s he took a position with CFCW (AM) radio in Camrose, Alberta. In the late 1970s, he moved to the ITV network in Edmonton.

From 1980 to 1985, Liepert held the position of Press Secretary to Premier Peter Lougheed. He served as a key aide to Lougheed during inter-provincial negotiations on energy policy and the Constitutional Accord of 1982.  He also participated in a number of federal-provincial conferences. Following that responsibility, he moved to the Ministry of Economic Development as the Trade Director of Western U.S. Operations. In 1991, he moved to the private sector to work for Telus where he was involved in both the purchase of Ed Tel and the BCTel merger in addition to the rebranding of AGT to Telus. From 2000 to 2004, Liepart owned his own public relations/communications consulting company and operated a childcare center in Calgary downtown area.

Member of the Legislative Assembly
Liepert first ran for a seat to the Alberta Legislature as a Progressive Conservative candidate in the electoral district of Edmonton-Highlands-Beverly in the 1993 Alberta general election. He finished third in the five-way race behind the winning candidate, Liberal Alice Hanson, and incumbent New Democrat John McInnis.

After spending some time in the private sector with Telus and a period self-employment doing public relations/communications consulting and owning a childcare centre, Liepert decided to return to politics. He next sought public office in the 2004 provincial election in the constituency of Calgary-West. In that election, Liepert received 52% of the vote. During his first two years as an MLA, he served as the chair of the Alberta Heritage Savings Trust Fund Committee, a co-chair for the Film Advisory Council, and was a Local Authority Elections Act special committee review team member.

Following the 2006 leadership race for the Progressive Conservative Association of Alberta, newly elected Premier Ed Stelmach appointed Liepert to be the Minister of Education. During his tenure as Education Minister, he also served as a member of the Cabinet Policy Committee on Community Services. In the 2008 provincial election, Liepert was reelected with 48% of the vote and appointed by the Premier as the Minister of Health and Wellness. In addition to his ministerial responsibilities, Liepert also served as a member of the Privileges and Elections, Standing Orders and Printing Committee.

As the Health Minister, Liepert dismantled the nine health regions of Alberta in favour of an Alberta Health Services "super" Board. In existence for five months and running a $1.3-billion deficit, they voted themselves, with Liepert's approval, a 25% raise.

He faced criticism over the handling of the flu immunization campaign for the 2009 flu pandemic.

On January 15, 2010, Liepert was sworn in as Minister of Energy.

Member of Parliament
On April 12, 2014, Liepert won the federal Conservative nomination in Calgary Signal Hill, defeating incumbent Rob Anders. Anders had been the MP for Calgary West, the predecessor to Signal Hill, since 1997.

On September 21, 2015, Liepert drew criticism from the left-wing Broadbent Institute newsletter Press Progress for his position on civil liberties and Bill C-51. During an all-candidates debate, he stated, "I know there's a whole group of people … who talk about civil liberties and about the freedom of having the right to pretty much choose to do what you like. Folks, that's not the country we live in … I'm fully in favour of Bill C-51."

On October 19, 2015, Liepert was elected MP for Calgary Signal Hill, winning with more than 60% of the vote.

During the 42nd Canadian Parliament, Liepert introduced one private member's bill, numbered C-229 and entitled the "Life Means Life Act", which proposed to mandate that persons found guilty of certain crimes, such as murder or treason, be sentenced to life imprisonment without eligibility for parole. The bill was defeated in a vote in September 2016 with only Conservative Party members voting in support. Then Justice Minister Peter MacKay had previously introduced this bill in the 41st Parliament in March 2015, as Bill C-53, though it was not adopted before the parliament ended.

In January 2021, it was revealed that Liepert had travelled to California twice during the COVID-19 pandemic, though the Canada–United States border was closed to all nonessential travel and public health orders urged people to avoid unnecessary travel. Liepert claimed the trips were for essential house maintenance to his Palm Desert home.

On February 17, 2023, Liepert announced that he would not run in the next federal election after finishing his service in the 44th Canadian Parliament.

Personal life
Liepert and his wife, Linda, have two adult children; one is deceased. He enjoys golfing and served as a board member at the Pinebrook Golf Club in Calgary. Liepert has coordinated various charitable affairs, such as celebrity sport dinners and several fundraising campaigns and benefits. He also volunteers his time at a variety of other community events.

Electoral record

Federal

Provincial

References

External links

1949 births
Living people
Canadian press secretaries
Canadian radio reporters and correspondents
Canadian television reporters and correspondents
Conservative Party of Canada MPs
Finance ministers of Alberta
Health ministers of Alberta
Members of the Executive Council of Alberta
Members of the House of Commons of Canada from Alberta
People from Saltcoats, Saskatchewan
Politicians from Calgary
Progressive Conservative Association of Alberta MLAs
Telus people
21st-century Canadian politicians